The list of ship commissionings in 1962 includes a chronological list of all ships commissioned in 1962.


See also 

1962
 Ship commissionings